Tarek Gustave El Moussa (born August 21, 1981) is a real estate investor and television personality. He is best known for co-hosting HGTV's Flip or Flop alongside his ex-wife Christina Hall. The pair found success flipping houses as an alternative to their previous business of selling real estate, which took a hit during the 2008 economic crisis.

Professional background 

El Moussa got his real estate license in 2002, at the age of 21. He had a lucrative career selling real estate until the 2008 economic crisis, when the business he shared with then-wife, Christina Haack, began to struggle. At that time, the couple had no choice but to give up their $6,000/month home to move to a $700/month apartment. The pair then ventured into a new real estate strategy - flipping houses. During their first flip, El Moussa submitted an audition tape to HGTV that followed the pair's process of flipping a house. The network picked up the show, which has seen a popular 10-season run, with season 10 premiering on HGTV in December 2021.

Despite the couple's divorce, they continued working together on Flip or Flop, with Tarek saying to People, "From the beginning, HGTV has shown Christina and me tremendous support and we are excited to go out there and flip many more houses for Flip or Flop."

In 2020, El Moussa launched a second HGTV show, Flipping 101 with Tarek El Moussa, in which he serves as a mentor to novice house-flippers. On December 2, 2022, he and his second wife Heather Rae shared a first look at their upcoming show "The Flipping El Moussas", set to release on March 2, 2023.

Personal life 

Tarek Gustave El Moussa was born on August 21, 1981 to a Lebanese Catholic father, whose family migrated to Egypt, and a Belgian mother, whose maiden name is Arnould, in Long Beach, California. In 2000, he graduated from Sunny Hills High School in Fullerton, California. He has an older sister. He married Christina Haack in May 2009.  The couple met while working at a real estate office, later entering into business together.

Their daughter was born on September 22, 2010. Their son was born on August 20, 2015.

In 2013, Tarek was diagnosed with cancer. A Flip or Flop viewer, nurse Ryan Reade, "noticed that at certain angles, at certain times, it just caught my eye that Tarek had a lump on his throat" and contacted producers. Tarek has been in remission since 2014.

Tarek and Christina divorced in 2018.

El Moussa started dating actress and real estate agent Heather Rae Young in 2019. They married October 23, 2021, at the Rosewood Miramar Beach Hotel in Montecito. The wedding was the subject of the Discovery+ special "Tarek and Heather: The Big I Do." 

In July 2022, the couple announced Heather's pregnancy and that they were expecting a baby boy, conceived naturally, in early 2023. Tarek announced their son's birth on January 31, 2023, on Instagram. 

Tarek reportedly dedicated a star to Heather Rae in September 2022, through the International Star Registry. They have also stated that they've considered having more children in the future and "still have the embryos" from Heather's IVF treatments.

Filmography

References 

1981 births
American people of Lebanese descent
American people of Belgian descent
American television hosts
American real estate brokers
Living people